Rob Hennelly (born 8 March 1990) is a Gaelic footballer who plays for Breaffy and for the Mayo county team.

Hennelly left the Mayo panel in 2012 after being the number one goalkeeper throughout 2011, but returned to the panel in 2013 for the Connacht final when goalkeepers David Clarke and Kenneth O'Malley were both injured.

Work
In February 2014, Rob, alongside former Mayo senior team player Cathal Freeman, set up Love Media, a digital communications agency,

References

1990 births
Living people
DCU Gaelic footballers
Gaelic football goalkeepers
Mayo inter-county Gaelic footballers
People from Castlebar